Doux is a French-language surname. "Doux" means  meaning "sweet", "soft", "gentle" in French. Notable people with the surname include: 

 Pierre Doux, founder of Groupe Doux, French food company

See also

French-language surnames